Iliyan Trifonov (born 30 September 1984) is a Bulgarian footballer who plays as a midfielder.

Career
Trifonov started his football career with Etar 1924 before moving to Slavia Sofia in the year 2005. He made his A PFG debut for the Sofia-based club in August 2005, but did not become a regular to the end of the season and returned to Etar.

References

External links

Living people
1984 births
Association football midfielders
Bulgarian footballers
FC Etar 1924 Veliko Tarnovo players
PFC Slavia Sofia players
PFC Vidima-Rakovski Sevlievo players
FC Lyubimets players
SFC Etar Veliko Tarnovo players
First Professional Football League (Bulgaria) players
People from Veliko Tarnovo
Sportspeople from Veliko Tarnovo Province